Fangda Partners is a law firm headquartered in Shanghai, China with offices in Beijing, Guangzhou, Shenzhen and Hong Kong. It is one of the 15 largest China-based law firms measured by number of lawyers. It is one of the most profitable law firms in China measured by either revenue or profit per partner and is generally believed to be the most difficult law firm to be hired at.

Fangda currently has offices in Beijing, Hong Kong, Shanghai, Shenzhen and Guangzhou.

Fangda is smaller than other large law firms and has a relatively narrower focus on high-value work for high-end financial institution clients and major multinationals. While Fangda is making efforts to break into other practice areas, the firm currently focuses on mergers and acquisitions, private equity, commercial litigation and arbitration, and bankruptcy as well as the capital market.

History
Fangda Partners was founded in Shanghai in 1993 by six partners.

Fangda opened an office in Hong Kong in April 2012, following the recruitment of former Freshfields Bruckhaus Deringer litigation partner Peter Yuen.

Fangda joined Ius Laboris, the international HR law firm network, in 2012.

Main practice areas
Fangda has the following main practice areas:

 Antitrust/Competition
 Asset-Backed Securities
 Banking & Finance
 Capital Markets
 Compliance & Government Enforcement
 Dispute Resolution
 Energy & Infrastructure
 Finance Institutions
 General Industries
 Insolvency & Restructuring
 Intellectual Property
 Investment Funds
 Investment Management
 Labour & Employment
 Life Sciences & Healthcare
 M&A
 Private Equity
 Private Wealth Management
 Real Estate & Construction
 Technology, Media & Telecommunications

See also 
List of largest Chinese law firms
Legal History of China
Chinese law

References

External links
Fangda Partners official site

Law firms of China
Law firms established in 1993